The 2013 New York City Public Advocate election was held on November 5, 2013, along with elections for the Mayor, Comptroller, Borough Presidents, and members of the New York City Council. Incumbent Democratic Public Advocate Bill de Blasio, serving his first term, ran for Mayor of New York City rather than seek re-election.

The Democratic Party held its primary on September 10, and since no candidate reached 40%, a runoff was held on October 1 between the top two candidates, Councilwoman Letitia James and State Senator Daniel Squadron. James won the runoff to become the Democratic nominee.

The Republican Party did not nominate a candidate. In the general election, James faced Green Party nominee James Lane and Conservative nominee Robert Maresca as well as various minor party candidates.

James won the general election in a landslide.

Democratic primary

Candidates

Declared
 Cathy Guerriero, adjunct professor at Columbia University and New York University
 Letitia James, New York City Councilwoman (also received the Working Families Party nomination)
 Reshma Saujani, former Deputy Public Advocate and candidate for New York's 14th congressional district in 2010
 Daniel Squadron, State Senator
 Sidique Wai, New York University professor

Declined
Bill de Blasio, incumbent Public Advocate (running for mayor)

Tone
The runoff between Letitia James and Daniel Squadron was characterized as bitter by most of the media outlets that covered it.

Polling

Primary results

Republican primary
No Republican candidate filed to run for the office.

Major third parties
Besides the two main parties, the Conservative, Green, Independence and Working Families parties are qualified New York parties. These parties have automatic ballot access.

Conservative

Nominee
 Robert Maresca

Green

Nominee
 James Lane, an internet media professional and Green Party activist. In 2013 he ran for New York City Public Advocate and in 2015 he ran for Congress against the Republican candidate Dan Donovan who was the District Attorney that failed to indict anyone in the killing of Eric Garner. He is a member of the Adoptee Rights, Black Lives Matter and Stop Mass Incarceration movements. His current titles include: Director of Analytics & Implementation, GroupM and Editor-in-Chief, Hot Indie News

Working Families

Nominee
 Letitia James, New York City Councilwoman from Brooklyn

Minor third parties
The following parties without automatic ballot access succeeded in petitioning onto the ballot:

Freedom

Nominee
 Michael K. Lloyd

Libertarian

Nominee
 Alex Merced, author, columnist, and blogger

Socialist Worker

Nominee
 Deborah O. Liatos

Students First

Nominee
 Mollena G. Fabricant

War Veterans

Nominee
 Irene Estrada

General Election results

References

External links
Letitia "Tish" James for Public Advocate
James Lane for Public Advocate
Alex Merced for Public Advocate

2013 New York (state) elections
2013
2013 in New York City